Mikhail Iakovlev (born 9 September 2000) is a Russian-born Israeli racing cyclist. He won the bronze medal in the keirin event at the 2021 UCI Track Cycling World Championships representing Russia.

References

External links
 

2000 births
Living people
Russian male cyclists
Russian track cyclists